David Williams FRS is a Welsh mathematician who works in probability theory.

Biography

David Williams was born at Gorseinon, near Swansea, Wales, and educated at Gowerton Grammar School, winning a mathematics scholarship to Jesus College, Oxford, and went on to obtain a DPhil under the supervision of David George Kendall and Gerd Edzard Harry Reuter, with a thesis titled Random time substitution in Markov chains.

He held posts at the Stanford University (1962–63), University of Durham, University of Cambridge (1966–69), and at Swansea University (1969–85), where he was promoted to a personal chair in 1972.

In 1985, he was elected to the Professorship of Mathematical Statistics, University of Cambridge, where he remained until 1992, serving as Director of the Statistical Laboratory between 1987 and 1991. Following this, he held the Chair of Mathematical Sciences jointly with the Mathematics and Statistics Groups at the University of Bath.

In 1999, he returned to Swansea University, where he currently holds a Research Professorship.

Williams's research interests encompass Brownian motion, diffusions, Markov processes, martingales and Wiener–Hopf theory.  Recognition for his work includes being elected Fellow of the Royal Society in 1984, where he was cited for his achievements on the construction problem for Markov chains and on path decompositions for Brownian motion, and being awarded the London Mathematical Society's Pólya Prize in 1994.

One of his main discoveries is the decomposition of Brownian paths with respect to their maximum.

He is the author of Probability With Martingales and Weighing the Odds, and co-author (with L. C. G. Rogers) of both volumes of Diffusions, Markov Processes and Martingales.

Books
Diffusions, Markov processes, and martingales, Wiley 1979; 2nd. edn. with L. C. G. Rogers: Diffusions, Markov processes, and martingales, Volume One: Foundations, Wiley 1995; reprinting of 2nd edn. Cambridge University Press 2000
with L. C. G. Rogers: Diffusions, Markov processes, and martingales, Volume Two: Itō calculus, Wiley 1988; 2nd edn. Cambridge University Press 2000
Probability with martingales, Cambridge Mathematical Textbooks, Cambridge University Press 1991
Weighing the Odds: a course in probability and statistics, Cambridge University Press 2001
ed. with J. C. R. Hunt, O. M. Phillips: Turbulence and stochastic processes. Kolmogorov´s ideas 50 years on, London, Royal Society 1991

Notes

References

External links

20th-century British mathematicians
21st-century British mathematicians
Alumni of Jesus College, Oxford
Fellows of the Royal Society
Living people
People from Swansea
Probability theorists
Welsh mathematicians
Year of birth missing (living people)
People educated at Gowerton Grammar School
Stanford University Department of Mathematics faculty
Academics of Durham University
Academics of Swansea University
Professors of the University of Cambridge
Academics of the University of Bath